Kamal Mahgoub Mahmoud  (10 December 1921 – 9 February 2007) was a bantamweight weightlifter from Egypt who set a world record in the snatch in 1950. He won two silver and three bronze medals at the world championships in 1949–1955 and placed fifth at the 1952 Summer Olympics.

References

1921 births
2007 deaths
Olympic weightlifters of Egypt
Weightlifters at the 1952 Summer Olympics
World Weightlifting Championships medalists
20th-century Egyptian people
21st-century Egyptian people